Ayala Alabang, in terms of land area, is the third largest barangay in Muntinlupa, Metro Manila, Philippines. A large portion of it came from Barangay Alabang. Its land area of  includes Alabang Town Center, Ayala Alabang Village, El Molito, Madrigal Business Park, and Alabang Country Club.

History
Barangay Ayala Alabang was created by Batas Pambansa Bilang 219 on March 25, 1982, initially named as Barangay New Alabang Village. It was originally a part of Barangay Alabang prior to the separation.

In compliance of Section 3 of Batas Pambansa Bilang 219, which provides that "the first barangay officials shall be appointed by the President of the Philippines and shall hold office until their successors shall have been elected or appointed and qualified", then-President Ferdinand E. Marcos appointed Enrique Zóbel de Ayala as the first Barangay Chairman, with Gumersindo Leuterio, Benito Araneta, Edgardo Gatchalián, Mario Torcuator, Jaime Matiás, and Íñigo Zóbel as the first seven Kagawad (councilors). The first elected Barangay Chairman was Vicente Chua who was inducted in 1989, along with the elected Kagawads Oscar Antiquera, Alfred Xerez-Burgos Jr., Francisco Umali, Wilma Pálafox, Rolando Pineda, and Ramón Fernández.

The name was changed to Barangay Ayala Alabang in November 2003, after a public hearing conducted by the Muntinlupa City Government for this purpose, although New Alabang Village is still used as the barangay's alternative name.

Government 
Don Enrique Zobel, the first Barangay Chairman, was appointed in 1981. Danilo Tolentino served from 1984 to 1987 and Mr. Anthony Abaya served from 1987 to 1989. Mr. Vicente Chua became the first elected barangay chairman in 1989, assuming together with Kagawads Oscar Antiquera (later a barangay chairman), Alfred Xerez-Burgos Jr., Ramon Fernandez, Wilma Palafox, Rolando Pineda, and Francisco Umali. He was elected President of the Association of Barangay Council of Muntinlupa, and a sectoral representative in the then Sangguniang Bayan of Muntinlupa, representing the Barangay sector from 1989 to 1997. Chua resigned in 1998.

See also 

 Muntinlupa
 Alabang
 De La Salle Santiago Zobel School

References

External links 
 Official Website of Barangay Ayala Alabang
 Official Website of Ayala Alabang Village Association (AAVA)

Muntinlupa
Gated communities in Metro Manila
Barangays of Metro Manila